Paul Marshall may refer to:
Paul Marshall (cricketer) (born 1949), English cricketer
Paul Marshall (investor) (born 1959), British investor and philanthropist
Paul Marshall (swimmer) (1961–2009), British swimmer
Paul Marshall (footballer) (born 1989), English footballer
Paul Marshall (rugby union) (born 1985), Irish rugby union footballer 
Paul Marshall (ice hockey, born 1960), Canadian ice hockey left winger
Paul Marshall (ice hockey, born 1966), American ice hockey player
Paul V. Marshall (born 1947), bishop of Episcopal Diocese of Bethlehem
Paul Marshall (comics), British comics artist, see List of minor 2000 AD stories

See also
Paula Marshall (born 1964), American actress
Paule Marshall (1929–2019), American novelist